David Kotulski is an American football coach and former player. He is as the defensive coordinator at Mercyhurst University in Erie, Pennsylvania, a position he had held since 2016. Kotulski served as the head football coach at Bucknell University for one season, in 2002, compiling a record of 2–9. He played college football at New Mexico State University.

Head coaching record

References

External links
 Mercyhurst profile

Year of birth missing (living people)
Living people
American football linebackers
Bucknell Bison football coaches
Holy Cross Crusaders football coaches
Lehigh  Mountain Hawks football coaches
Mercyhurst Lakers football coaches
New Mexico State Aggies football players
Saint Mary's Gaels football coaches
Utah State Aggies football coaches
Utah Utes football coaches
Vanderbilt Commodores football coaches